The Amity School in Lincolnton, Georgia, United States is a historic school built during 1902–04. It was also used as a meeting hall. It was added to the National Register of Historic Places in 1993. It is located at Clay Hill Road west of the junction with GA 43.

It has a steep hipped roof and a full-width one-story porch, with a bell tower protruding from the front slope of the roof.

See also
 National Register of Historic Places listings in Lincoln County, Georgia

References

Schools in Lincoln County, Georgia
National Register of Historic Places in Lincoln County, Georgia